Bam Island may refer to: 
Bam Island (Papua New Guinea)
Bamseom